The 43rd District of the Iowa House of Representatives in the state of Iowa.

Current elected officials
Jennifer Konfrst is the representative currently representing the district.

Past representatives
The district has previously been represented by:
 Foster F. Felger, 1965–1967
 Elizabeth Orr Shaw, 1967–1971
 Richard M. Radl, 1971–1973
 Sonja Egenes, 1973–1983
 David Osterberg, 1983–1993
 Mona Martin, 1993–2001
 Joe Seng, 2001–2003
 Mark Smith, 2003–2013
 Chris Hagenow, 2013–2019
 Jennifer Konfrst, 2019–present

References

043